Kyle Douglas Morrell (October 9, 1963 – November 15, 2020) was an American football defensive back. He played for the Minnesota Vikings in 1986. Morrell died on November 15, 2020, from Amyotrophic lateral sclerosis (ALS).

References

1963 births
2020 deaths
Players of American football from Scottsdale, Arizona
American football defensive backs
BYU Cougars football players
Minnesota Vikings players
Neurological disease deaths in Utah
Deaths from motor neuron disease